Billy Kay is an American actor and singer. As a toddler, he first appeared in the 1987 comedy Three Men and a Baby. He continued with uncredited roles in films such as Alice (1990) and several independent films. At the age of eleven, he starred in the stage musical Oliver! and appeared in more theatrical plays including The Who's Tommy and The Prince and the Pauper.

Kay made his major screen debut with the role of Shayne Lewis on the CBS soap opera Guiding Light, which earned him a nomination for a YoungStar Award for Best Young Actor in a Daytime TV Series.

Filmography

Films

Television

Theatre

Music video appearances

References

External links
 

Kay, Billy
American filmographies